Castlegregory are a Gaelic Athletic Association club based in the parish of Castlegregory in Kerry, Ireland. This is a Gaelic football only club, with no hurling played. The club is a member of the West Kerry division of Kerry GAA. They play their home games in the newly renovated surrounds of Pairc An Caislean located just outside the parish's main village of the same name.

The club fields teams at all age groups from U10 through to Senior and has an excellent record at underage level with regular representation on county teams from U16 - U21.

History

Football was played in Castlegregory long before the GAA was founded in 1884.
The game of Caid was played in the parish of Castlegregory long before, and even after, the foundation of the GAA in Thurles in 1884. Caid itself seems to have been a combination of rough and tumble football and cross country running - the contestants being teams from neighbouring parishes.

One such game took place between Castle and Cloghane in 1886 at Dowling's Big Field in Stradbally with both sides claiming victory. A replay finally took place 2 years later with Cloghane winning. A local balladeer recalled the game in a song called "The Kickers of Lios na Caol Bhuidhe" which contains the immortal line: " ..they'd kick all before them from here to Tralee" Another line recounts events when the game became a little too robust: "The referee, with his whistle, was up on top a tree".!!!

The first official GAA club of the parish was known as Castlegregory Allen - in memory of William Allen, one of the Manchester Martyrs Allen, Larkin and O'Brien. The club took part in the first Kerry County Championship played in 1889 in which they met a team called Ó Breannan. After two draws, the second replay was played in Castle on 10 April, but the game was abandoned after O'Breannan refused to continue when Castle scored a disputed goal. However, as you would, both teams retired to a local hostelry and had a night of singing and dancing.

The first recorded meeting of the club took place in October 1889 and Mr Thomas Moore was elected president and the officers elected with him were Silvester Egan, Hugh O'Flaherty. Michael Kelliher, John Fitzgerald, Eugene Foran and Michael O'Sullivan. John Foran and Thomas McCarthy were elected captain and vice captain respectively. Tom O'Flaherty from Fahamore soon became Honorary Secretary of the Kerry County Board and not long after Castle became a proper affiliated club

The club took part in the first Senior Kerry County Championship played in 1889 reaching the Semi Final eventually losing to the Killarney Crokes ( Dr.Crokes).

Competitions
Kerry GAA competitions are divided into two distinct branches - divisional and county.
In divisional competitions, teams face off against their neighbours from within their own geographical area. In Castlegregory's case, this means that they play against other West Kerry clubs such as Dingle, An Gaeltacht, Lispole and fierce rivals Annascaul.

County competitions involve matches against opposition from throughout County Kerry and are independent of divisional championships.

Castlegregory also send players to form part of the West Kerry divisional team which competes in the Kerry County Championships at Minor, U21 and Senior levels.

Club Foundations: Bord na nÓg

All of Castlegregory's underage teams take part in similar county Gaelic football and divisional competitions.

Castle have regularly been strong contenders in their county league divisions, winning several titles at all underage brackets over the past 20 years or so, most notably a County Minor 3-in-a-row side in the mid 1990s.

Parish Leagues
As a large parish - end to end is about 30 miles - comprising many sizeable townlands and villages, early Castle teams suffered from logistical difficulties when it came to the organisation of training sessions.

To overcome this, a parish league was formed which pitted the best 15 from each or the larger townlands against each other. The main protagonists included teams from Cloghane, Stradbally, Aughacasla, Camp, Maharees and Castlegregory.

As the local population declined many townlands had trouble finding 15 players, to the point where the parish league was disbanded.

In its place, we now have an annual once off game between the East of the Parish and the West of the Parish. These clashes take place every December, normally around St Stephen's Day.
Often tough affairs, featuring a cameo or two from former greats who just doesn't know when to lie down, the matches usually draw a large crowd.
Some things never change though and once the old scores are settled and rivalries renewed, it all ends with a trophy presentation and a pint in one of Castle's well known watering holes.

Notable players

Castlegregory has had some wonderful players through the years, many of whom never made it into a Kerry shirt but may well have been able to lay claim to one. Of those who did, Pat O'Shea and Tom Moriarty are two of the most notable. Both are featured in the book "Princes Of Pigskin", which chronicles the men and women who have made Kerry great.

Many Castlegregory players have been honoured at schools level with Tralee CBS , Gaelcholáiste Chiarraí and Meán Scoil Nua an Leith Triúigh & also in third level Sigerson Cup with various third level institutions Micheál O' Sé (2001) & JB Spillane (2011) with UCC,Seán Mahoney with IT Tralee (1998)

Kerry Senior Football Team 
 Pat "Aeroplane" O'Shea (1910 - 1914)
 James Kennedy (1950 - 1950) - 1 Appearances
 Michael Moriarty (1953 - 1953) - 3 Appearances
 Tom Moriarty (1951 - 1954)
 Jack Dowling (1956 - 1961) - 33 Appearances
 Pat Dowling (1960 - 1960) - 4 Appearances
 MJ O'Shea (1965 - 1968) - 4 Appearances
 Tom Kelliher (1967 - 1967) - 1 Appearances
 Mossie O'Connor (1969 - 1969) - 1 Appearances
 John Healy (1985 - 1985) - 4 Appearances
 Sean O'Mahony (1997 - 1997) - 21 Appearances
 Alan Fitzgerald (2014 - 2016) - 18 Appearances
 Ciara Butler (2018–Present )

Junior Players 
Castlegregory players represented Kerry at Junior grade

 Sean O'Mahony (1997 - 2001) 9 Appearances
 Derek McNamara (2000 - 2003) 13 Appearances
 David Heasman (2000 - 2000) 1 Appearances
 Micheál O'Shea (2001 - 2001) 1 Appearances
 Alan Lynch (2004 - 2004) 2 Appearances
 Gavin O'Connor (2010 - 2010) 4 Appearances
 Alan Fitzgerald (2010 - 2013) 4 Appearances

U20/U21 Players 
Castlegregory players represented Kerry at U21/U20 grade

 Jason Wieboldt (1991 - 1992) 3 Appearances
 Sean O'Mahony (1997 - 1997) 5 Appearances
 Micheál O'Shea (2000 - 2000) 3 Appearances
 Stephen Browne (2009 - 2009) 1 Appearances
 JB Spillane (2009 - 2009) 1 Appearances
 Shane Hennessey (2009 - 2009) 1 Appearances
 Alan Fitzgerald (2011 - 2011) 2 Appearances

Minor Players 
Castlegregory players represented Kerry at Minor grade

 Pierce Ferriter (1987 - 1987) 1 Appearances
 Jason Wieboldt (1990 - 1990) 6 Appearances
 Sean O'Mahony (1993 - 1994) 6 Appearances
 Micheál O'Shea (1996 - 1997) 5 Appearances
 Stephen Browne (2006 - 2006) 5 Appearances
 JB Spillane (2007 - 2007) 4 Appearances
 Thomas O'Donnell (2020 - 2020) 4 Appearances
 Maurice O'Connell (2020 - 2020) 4 Appearances
 Caolán Ó’Conaill (2020 - 2020) 3 Appearances
 Joseph Scully (2007 - 2007) 1 Appearances
 Ciara Butler (2019)
 Finóla Ní Chathasaigh (2022)

Roll of honour

 West Kerry Senior Football Championship: (3) 1966, 1973, 1977
 Kerry Intermediate Football Championship: (1) 1975
 Kerry Junior Football Championship: (3) 1974, 2009, 2021
 Munster Junior Club Football Championship: (1) 2009
 All-Ireland Junior Club Football Championship: (1) 2010

References 

https://www.the42.ie/meath-v-kerry-5830153-Jul2022/

External links
Official Castlegregory GAA Club website

Gaelic games clubs in County Kerry
Gaelic football clubs in County Kerry